"She Loves Control" is a song by Cuban-American singer Camila Cabello, included on her debut studio album Camila (2018). It was written by the singer, Ilsey Juber and Mustafa Ahmed and its producers Skrillex, Frank Dukes and Louis Bell. Musically, "She Loves Control" is an EDM and reggaeton track that uses elements of moombahton. The song received generally positive reviews from music critics, who commended its production. Commercially, it debuted in Norway and the United Kingdom, peaking at 36 and 40, respectively. Moreover, it charted in Switzerland, Spain, Canada, Sweden and the Netherlands, peaking at 59, 69, 77, 77 and 81, respectively. In the United Kingdom, "She Loves Control" received a silver certification for 200,000 copies sold in the country.

Composition
"She Loves Control" is an "electronica-tinged, dancehall-ready" track including a Spanish guitar and a thumping bassline. In an interview backstage at KDWB Jingle Ball 2017, a fan asked Cabello what her favorite song to perform was; she responded saying "I'm excited to perform this one song, it's called 'She Loves Control' and I'm excited to perform it just because it's very fun. I wouldn't say it's my favorite one on the album because they're all my favorites for different reasons, just excited to perform that one because I feel like it's gonna have - cool - like dance stuff".

Critical reception
Jamieson Cox of Pitchfork penned, "'She Loves Control' is an apt mission statement for a star who soured on girl group life because she couldn't explore [her] individuality, and it shows Cabello can navigate a moombahton rhythm with the same ease that characterized 'Havana.'"

Credits and personnel
Credits adapted from the liner notes of Camila.

Publishing
 Published by Sony/ATV Songs LLC (BMI) O/b/O Sony ATV Music Publishing (UK) Ltd./Maidmetal Limited (PRS)/Milamoon Songs (BMI) // Copaface (ASCAP) All rights admin. by Kobalt Songs Music Publishing // EMI April Music, Inc. (ASCAP) O/b/O EMI Music Publishing Ltd. (PRS)/Nyankingmusic (ASCAP) // EMI April Music, Inc. (ASCAP) // Sony/ATV Songs LLC/Sparko Phone Music (BMI) // Mustafaahmed Publishing Designee

Recording
 Recorded at Electric Feel Recording Studio, West Hollywood, California
 Mixed at Larrabee Studio, West Hollywood, California
 Mastered at Sterling Sound, New York City, New York

Personnel

 Camila Cabello – vocals, songwriting
 Skrillex – production, songwriting
 Frank Dukes – co-production, songwriting
 Louis Bell – vocal production, recording, songwriting
 Ilsey Juber – songwriting
 Mustafa Ahmed – songwriting
 Loshendrix – guitar
 Manny Marroquin – mixing
 Chris Galland – mix engineering
 Robin Florent – mixing assistant
 Scott Desmarais – mixing assistant
 Kevin Peterson – mastering

Charts

Certifications

References

External links

2018 songs
Reggaeton songs
Songs written by Frank Dukes
Songs written by Camila Cabello
Camila Cabello songs
Songs written by Skrillex
Songs written by Ilsey Juber
Songs with feminist themes
Songs written by Louis Bell
Song recordings produced by Frank Dukes
Song recordings produced by Louis Bell
Song recordings produced by Skrillex